Knut T. Storbukås (born 23 April 1943), more commonly known by his stage name, Sputnik, is a musician and truck driver from Bostrak in the village of Tørdal which is in the municipality of Drangedal, Telemark. His most well known songs are Skilles Johanne og Lukk opp din hjertedør Open Up Your Heart (And Let the Sunshine In).

In only a few years, Storbukås sold more than one million cassettes, and set records in a series of places where he performed. He was rated as artist of the year in Norway in 1990, and in the fall of 1993 he got into the Guinness Book of World Records when he performed thirty-six times in locations from Mandal in the south to Tromsø in the north in only 72 hours.

During Easter in 1990, he was in the Soviet Union and was a part of the most original music video that a Norwegian had ever made at the time. Under glasnost, Sputnik stood in Red Square in Moscow and sang Lukk opp din hjertedør. The video was later shown in its entirety in Norwegian on Dagsrevyen. Sputnik stole the show during the opening of TV2 in Grieghallen in the fall of 1992, in a duet with Kjell Bekkelund.

He has also performed in Sweden, Denmark, United States, Svalbard, Zanzibar, and Spain. However, most of all, he has performed hundreds of times in both big and small places around all of Norway. In the beginning, Sputnik received a harsh treatment from the critics, but he was loved by the people.

Today, Sputnik is a living legend, and a symbol of popularity in Norway. There are books written about Sputnik, and he has been mentioned in Stortinget. Norway's Prime Minister has visited Sputnik at his home, and each year thousands of his fans come to visit him at home in Bostrak. As a bunch of artists have done, in the United States and other places abroad, Sputnik has given everyone that wishes the permission to see his large collection of silver, gold, diamond, and platinum records in his own Sputnik Museum.

Discography

Albums 
 Sputnik 1 (1986)
 Sputnik 2 (1986)
 Sputnik 3 (1987)
 Sputnik 4 (1988)
 Sputnik 5 (1989)
 Romjulsmusikken til Sputnik (1989)
 Sputnik 6 (1990)
 Sputnik 7 (1991)
 Den store festkassetten (1991)
 Sputnik 8 (1992)
 Bedehusmusikken til Sputnik (1993)
 Sputnik 9 (1994)
 Sputnik 10 (1995)
 Gull og grønne skoger (1996)
 Lykkelandet Zanzibar (1997)
 Sputnik 11 (2001)
 Sputnik 12 (2001)
 Sputnik 13 (2003)
 Sputnik 20 (2006)
 Det er vanskelig å være beskjeden (2007)
 50 år på veien (2009)

External links
 Sputnik's Website

1943 births
Living people
People from Drangedal
Norwegian male singers
Norwegian musicians